Army Wives is an American television drama series that premiered on Lifetime on June 3, 2007. Based on the book by Tanya Biank, the series follows the lives of four army wives, one army husband, and their families.

 The series was canceled on September 24, 2013. A two-hour retrospective special, titled Army Wives: A Final Salute, aired on March 16, 2014.

Series overview

Episodes

Season 1 (2007)

Season 2 (2008)

Season 3 (2009)

Season 4 (2010)

Season 5 (2011)

Season 6 (2012)

Season 7 (2013)

Specials

References

External links

Army Wives
Lists of American drama television series episodes